Two ships of the United States Navy have borne the name USS Walker, in honor of Admiral John Grimes Walker (1835–1907), who served during the American Civil War.

Sold to the Italian Navy, she was renamed Fante (D-516), and served until 1977.

United States Navy ship names